"You'll Follow Me Down" is a song by Skunk Anansie, released as the final single from Post Orgasmic Chill. It was released in October 1999 and was the last release from the band – until their 2009 reunion. The CD was released as a limited, numbered edition to mark the end of the band.

Track listing

CD single

Chart

You'll Follow Me Down was ineligible to chart the UK Singles charts because of regulations for chart inclusion said that a CD must be under 20 minutes long if more than one track, including remixes, is featured. This CD featured three tracks and two remixes which made it ineligible.

Notes

1999 singles
Skunk Anansie songs
1999 songs
Virgin Records singles
Songs written by Skin (musician)
Songs written by Len Arran